Colegio El Roble Interlomas is a private school in Col. Hacienda de las Palmas, Huixquilucan, State of Mexico. It serves preschool through high school (preparatoria).

References

External links
 Colegio El Roble 

High schools in the State of Mexico